, also known under the name , is a Japanese voice actress who specializes in voicing characters in adult video games. She is a member of the Tokyo Actor's Consumer's Cooperative Society.

Filmography

Anime
Cardfight!! Vanguard – Kamui Katsuragi
Cardfight!! Vanguard G – Kamui Katsuragi
Comic Party – Eimi Oba
Dokkiri Doctor – Hongō Yukihiro
Fafner of the Azure – Kiyomi Kaname
Flame of Recca – Kurei (child)
Haré+Guu – Sagin
 Live On Cardliver Kakeru – Kakeru Amao
Mirmo! – Wind
Naruto – Inari
Naruto Shippūden – Inari
Oden-kun – Konbu-kun, Meat-boy
Saru Get You -On Air- – Kakeru
Sket Dance – Mrs. Tsubaki
Sumomo mo Momo mo – Tenchi Koganei (Ep. 17)

Games
Chijoku no Kankei 2 
Comic Party
Eve
Gyangyan Bunny 6 i♥mail
Kizumono no Gakuen case of saint spica
Kizumono no Shōjo Kizumoto no Gakuen Gaiden
Mahō Tenshi Misaki
One: Kagayaku Kisetsu e
Ore no Miko-san
Refrain Blue
Sacrifice: Seifuku Kari
Snowboard Kids 2 – Wendy
White Princess
Yuki Uta

Tokusatsu
 Engine Sentai Go-onger as Engine Toripter
 Engine Sentai Go-onger: Boom Boom! Bang Bang! GekijōBang!! as Engine Toripter
 Engine Sentai Go-onger vs. Gekiranger as Engine Toripter
 Samurai Sentai Shinkenger vs. Go-onger: GinmakuBang!! as Engine Toripter

References
Shizuka Ishikawa at the Voice Artist DataBase 

1971 births
Japanese voice actresses
Living people
21st-century Japanese actresses
Tokyo Actor's Consumer's Cooperative Society voice actors